Conrad George Selvig (October 11, 1877 – August 2, 1953) was a Republican member of the United States House of Representatives.

Biography
Conrad George Selvig was born in Rushford, Minnesota.  He was the son of Gunder C Selvig (1842–1935) and  Guri Maria Hagnestad Selvig (1845–1882), immigrants from Stavanger, Norway. His father worked for the Chicago, Milwaukee, and St. Paul Railroad. Conrad Selvig fought in the Spanish–American War as a member of the 12th Minnesota Volunteer Infantry. He graduated from Rushford High School (1895) and the University of Minnesota (1908). He worked as an educator and educational administrator for various school districts in Fillmore County, Minnesota and Crookston, Minnesota during his lifetime. In 1910, Selvig was appointed as Superintendent of the Northwest School of Agriculture in Crookston, Minnesota where he served for 17 years. He also served as president of the  Minnesota Education Association (1908–1909) and the Northwestern Minnesota Education Association (1921–1922).

Selvig was a U.S. Representative from Minnesota's 9th congressional district. He served in the 70th, 71st, and 72nd congresses, March 4, 1927 – March 3, 1933. He died in 1953 in Los Angeles, California and was interred in Oakdale Cemetery in Crookston, Minnesota.

References

Other sources

Further reading
 Selvig, Conrad G. (1951) Tale of Two Valleys: An Autobiography (Los Angeles, CA: Grover Jones Press)

External links

 
 Northwest School of Agriculture

1877 births
1953 deaths
University of Minnesota alumni
American people of Norwegian descent
People from Rushford, Minnesota
Republican Party members of the United States House of Representatives from Minnesota
20th-century American educators